State Route 120 (SR 120) is a north–south secondary state highway located entirely in Stewart County in northwestern Middle Tennessee.

Route description

SR 120 starts at a junction with US 79/SR 76 near Big Rock.  The highway goes north for a short distance before turning west to pass along the north side of Big Rock. SR 120 then winds its way southwest before turning north again to pass through Bumpus Mills before coming to an end at the Kentucky state line, where it  continues as Kentucky Route 139 (KY 139) upon entry into Trigg County, Kentucky.

Major intersections

References

DeLorme Street Atlas USA.
Tennessee Department of Transportation (24 January 2003). "State Highway and Interstate List 2003".

120
Transportation in Stewart County, Tennessee